Bayburt District (also: Merkez, meaning "central") is a district of Bayburt Province of Turkey. Its seat is the city Bayburt. Its area is 2,705 km2, and its population is 70,277 (2021).

Composition
There is one municipality in Bayburt District:
 Arpalı
 Bayburt

There are 121 villages in Bayburt District:

 Adabaşı
 Ağören
 Akçakuzu
 Akduran
 Aksaçlı
 Akşar
 Alapelit
 Alıçlık
 Ardıçgöze
 Armutlu
 Arslandede
 Aşağıçimağıl
 Aşağıkışlak
 Aşağıpınarlı
 Aydıncık
 Balca
 Balkaynak
 Ballıkaya
 Başçımağıl
 Bayırtepe
 Bayraktar
 Buğdaylı
 Çakırbağ
 Çalıdere
 Çamdere
 Çamlıkoz
 Çayırözü
 Çayıryolu
 Çerçi
 Çiğdemtepe
 Çorak
 Dağçatı
 Dağtarla
 Danişment
 Darıca
 Değirmencik
 Demirışık
 Demirkaş
 Dikmetaş
 Dövmekaya
 Erenli
 Gençosman
 Gez
 Gökçeli
 Gökler
 Gökpınar
 Göldere
 Göloba
 Güder
 Güllüce
 Gümüşsu
 Güneydere
 Güzelce
 Hacıoğlu
 Harmanözü
 Helva
 Heybetepe
 Iğdır
 Kabaçayır
 Karlıca
 Karşıgeçit
 Kavacık
 Kavakyanı
 Kemertaş
 Kıratlı
 Kırkpınar
 Kitre
 Koçbayır
 Konursu
 Kop
 Kopuz
 Kozluk
 Kurbanpınar
 Kurugüney
 Maden
 Manas
 Masat
 Mutlu
 Nişantaşı
 Örence
 Ortaçımağıl
 Oruçbeyli
 Ozansu
 Pamuktaş
 Pelitli
 Petekkaya
 Polatlı
 Rüştü
 Sakızlı
 Salkımsu
 Sancaktepe
 Saraycık
 Sarıhan
 Sarımeşe
 Seydiyakup
 Sığırcı
 Sırakayalar
 Soğukgöze
 Söğütlü
 Taht
 Taşburun
 Taşçılar
 Taşkesen
 Taşocağı
 Tepetarla
 Tomlacık
 Uğrak
 Uğurgeldi
 Uluçayır
 Üzengili
 Yanıkçam
 Yaylalar
 Yaylapınar
 Yazyurdu
 Yedigöze
 Yeniköy
 Yerlice
 Yeşilyurt
 Yolaltı
 Yoncalı
 Yukarıkışlak

References

Districts of Bayburt Province